The 2020–21 James Madison Dukes women's basketball team represented James Madison University during the 2020–21 NCAA Division I women's basketball season. The Dukes, led by fifth-year head coach Sean O'Regan, played their home games at the Atlantic Union Bank Center as members of the Colonial Athletic Association (CAA). This was the first season the Dukes played their games at the new arena. They finished the season 14–10, 9–6 in CAA play. They received the number two seed in the CAA women's tournament and were eventually eliminated in the semifinal round of the tournament. They were not invited to any additional post-season play.

Previous season

Roster

Schedule and results

|-
!colspan=12 style=| Non-conference Regular Season
|-

|-
!colspan=12 style=| Conference Regular Season
|-

|-
!colspan=12 style=| CAA Tournament
|-

See also 
 2020–21 James Madison Dukes men's basketball team

References 

James Madison Dukes women's basketball seasons
James Madison
James Madison Dukes women's basketball
James Madison Dukes women's basketball